Snowfall is an American crime drama television series, created by John Singleton, Eric Amadio, and Dave Andron, that was first broadcast on FX on July 5, 2017. The series follows budding drug-dealer Franklin Saint (played by Damson Idris) as he navigates a way to sell crack cocaine during the 1980s crack epidemic in South Central L.A.. 

The series, which was first set up at Showtime in 2014, was picked up by FX for a ten-episode season in September 2016. In August 2017, the network renewed Snowfall for a second season, which premiered on July 19, 2018. In September 2018, the series was renewed for a third season, which premiered on July 10, 2019. In August 2019, FX renewed the series for a fourth season which was originally scheduled to premiere in 2020, but filming was temporarily suspended due to the COVID-19 pandemic. The fourth season premiered on February 24, 2021. In March 2021, FX renewed the series for a fifth season which premiered on February 23, 2022. In April 2022, FX renewed the series for a sixth and final season which premiered on February 22, 2023, with the series finale airing sometime in the spring of 2023.

Premise 
Set in Los Angeles 1983, the series revolves around the first crack epidemic and its impact on the city, and the stories of several characters whose lives are fated to intersect: 20-year-old drug dealer Franklin Saint, Mexican luchador Gustavo "El Oso" Zapata, CIA operative Teddy McDonald, and a Mexican crime boss's niece, Lucia Villanueva.

Cast

Main
Damson Idris as Franklin Saint, a young drug kingpin and patriarch of The Family, a crew of crack cocaine producers and dealers based in South Central Los Angeles.
Carter Hudson as Theodore "Teddy" McDonald / Reed Thompson, a CIA operative working undercover for the American government in the war against communism in Nicaragua.
Emily Rios as Lucia Villanueva (seasons 1–2), the daughter of a Mexican crime boss and heiress to the Villanueva Cartel, a Mexican drug cartel.
Sergio Peris-Mencheta as Gustavo "El Oso" Zapata, a former Mexican luchador affiliated with the Villaneuva Cartel.
Michael Hyatt as Sharon "Cissy" Saint, Franklin's mother and a veteran real estate agent.
Amin Joseph as Jerome Saint, Franklin's OG uncle and a member of The Family who introduces him to the criminal lifestyle.
Angela Lewis as Louanne "Louie" Saint (née Jones), Jerome's girlfriend, and later wife, a former hustler, and member of The Family.
Juan Javier Cardenas as Alejandro Usteves (season 1), a Nicaraguan Contra soldier and pilot who works with Teddy as a CIA asset by smuggling cocaine in order to fund a fight against the communists in Nicaragua.
Isaiah John as Leon Simmons, Franklin's best friend and second-in-command of the Family who is affiliated with the PJ Watts Crips.
Filipe Valle Costa as Pedro Nava (seasons 1–2), Lucia's cousin and a member of The Villanueva Cartel.
Alon Aboutboul as Avi Drexler (Hebrew: אבי דרקסלר) (seasons 1–5), an Israeli druglord and the head of a powerful Israeli crime syndicate who is formerly affiliated with Mossad.
Malcolm Mays as Kevin Hamilton (seasons 1–2), Franklin and Leon's best friend and a member of The Family.
Marcus Henderson as Andre Wright (season 3; recurring season 1; guest season 2), a sergeant in the LAPD, Melody's father and Franklin's neighbor.
Kevin Carroll as Alton Williams (season 4; recurring seasons 2–3; guest season 1), Franklin's estranged father and a former member of the Black Panthers who was previously homeless but later runs a homeless shelter.
Devyn A. Tyler as Veronique Turner (seasons 5–6), Franklin's girlfriend and a former lawyer, now works for him as a real estate manager and is pregnant with his child.
Gail Bean as Wanda Simmons (née Bell) (season 6; recurring seasons 2–5), Leon's girlfriend, and later wife, who develops a strong addiction to crack cocaine.
Alejandro Edda as Rubén (season 6; recurring season 5), a Cuban spy affiliated with the KGB who works with the Saints as part of a plan to eliminate Teddy.

Recurring

Reign Edwards as Melody Wright (seasons 1–3; guest season 4), Franklin's on/off girlfriend and Andre's daughter.
Peta Sergeant as Julia (seasons 1, 3; guest seasons 2, 5), Teddy's ex-wife, mother of their son Paul and a CIA agent.
Nic Bishop as James Ballard (season 1; guest season 2), Teddy's first CIA handler.
Judith Scott as Claudia Crane (seasons 1–2; guest season 3), the owner of a local nightclub and Louie's former lover.
Moe Irvin as Santos (season 1; guest season 3), Claudia's head of security.
Taylor Kowalski as Rob Volpe (seasons 1–3; guest seasons 4–5), Franklin's friend from high school, a crack bagger and a member of The Family.
Carlos Linares as Mauricio Villanueva (season 1), Lucia's father and the patriarch of the Villanueva Cartel.
José Zúñiga as Ramiro Nava (season 1), Lucia's maternal uncle and the second-in-command of the Villanueva Cartel.
Tony Sancho as Eduardo "Stomper" Castillo (season 1; guest season 2), the leader of Los Monarcas, a Mexican street gang.
Markice Moore as Ray-Ray (season 1; guest season 2), a reckless thief from Compton.
Craig Tate as Lenny (season 1), a violent thief from Compton and Ray-Ray's friend.
Justine Lupe as Victoria Grelli (season 1), a young woman who befriends Teddy whilst looking for her missing sister Kristen.
Michael Ray Escamilla as Hernan Zapata (seasons 1, 3–4; guest season 2), Gustavo's brother who is confined to a wheelchair.
Wade Allain-Marcus as Diego (season 2; guest seasons 1, 4), a co-leader of the Cali Cartel, a Colombian crime syndicate.
Izzy Diaz as Danilo (season 2; guest seasons 1, 4), Diego's brother and a co-leader of the Cali Cartel.
Jonathan Tucker as Matt McDonald (season 2; guest season 3), Teddy's older brother, a Vietnam War veteran and a pilot.
DeRay Davis as DeJohn "Peaches" Hill (seasons 2–5), a Vietnam War veteran and enforcer for The Family.
Adriana DeGirolami as Lorena Cardenas / Soledad Caro (seasons 2–3), Pedro's fiancé and an undercover DEA agent.
Marcelo Olivas as Santiago "Conejo" Estrada (season 2), an OG soldado who works with Los Manarcas.
Scott Subiono as Tony Marino (seasons 2–3, 6; guest seasons 4–5), a DEA Agent and Lorena's handler who works to stop the crack cocaine trade in Los Angeles.
Matthew Alan as Stephen Havemeyer (seasons 3–4 6; guest seasons 2, 5), Teddy's second CIA handler.
Jordan Coleman as Thaddeus "Fatback" Barber (seasons 3–4), Leon's bodyguard and a member of The Family.
Bentley Green as C.J. (seasons 3–4), an up-and-coming member of The Family.
Melvin Gregg as Drew "Manboy" Miller (seasons 3–4), Franklin's associate and the leader of the Compton Crips.
Calvin Clausell Jr. as Bootsy (season 3; guest season 4), the second-in-command of the Compton Crips.
Christian Tappan as Rigo Vasco (season 3), a drug lord associated with the Medellín Cartel, a Colombian crime syndicate.
Asjha Cooper as Eva Walker (season 3), one of Melody's best friends, and Leon's fling.
Nate' Jones as Shon-Shon (season 3), another of Melody's best friends.
Jesse Luken as Herb "Nix" Nixon (season 3; guest season 4), a rogue corporal in the LAPD and Andre's friend.
Evan Allen-Gessesse as Renny (seasons 4–6; guest seasons 2–3), an enforcer for The Family.
De'Aundre Bonds as Terrence "Skully" Brown (season 4; guest seasons 3, 5–6), the OG Leader of the Inglewood Bloods.
Corr Kendricks as Cornrows (season 4; guest seasons 3, 5), the second-in-command of the Inglewood Bloods.
Suzy Nakamura as Irene Abe (season 4), a journalist working for the Los Angeles Herald Examiner who investigates the ongoing drug trade in Los Angeles.
Stephen Ruffin as Wilson (season 4), Irene's assistant at the Los Angeles Herald Examiner.
Kwame Patterson as Lurp (season 4), a freelancer, Franklin's bodyguard and a member of The Family.
Geffri Maya as Khadijah Brown (season 4), Skully's wife, the mother of his daughter, Tianna Brown, and the sister of Manboy.
Adrianna Mitchell as Tanosse (season 4), Franklin's ex-girlfriend from high school whom he reconnects with.
Ezana Alem as Dimehead (season 4), a reckless member of the Compton Crips.
Joey Marie Urbina as Xiamara (seasons 4–6), Nuvia's sister and later Gustavo's girlfriend.
Christine Horn as Beverly "Black Diamond" Young (seasons 4–5; guest season 6), a bounty hunter and later an enforcer for The Family.
Taylor Polidore as Dallas Ali (seasons 4–5; guest season 6), a bounty hunter, Black Diamond's partner, and later an enforcer for The Family.
Quincy Chad as Deon "Big D" Barber (seasons 5–6; guest season 4), Fatback’s cousin and the OG leader of the PJ Watts Crips.
Kamron Alexander as Einstein (seasons 5–6; guest season 4), the brains behind Deon's Crip set.
Brandon Jay McLaren as Beau Buckley (seasons 5–6), a dirty cop and a leading detective in the LAPD involved in the C.R.A.S.H. unit.
DeLaRosa Rivera as Eddie Perez (season 5), a detective in the LAPD and Buckley's partner.
Tiffany Lonsdale as Parissa (seasons 5–6), an Iranian surgeon and old acquaintance of Teddy.
DeVaughn Nixon as Kane Hamilton (seasons 5–6), Kevin's OG older brother and a former shot caller for the Hoover Crips who, after being released from prison, plots revenge against The Family.
Nupeir L. Garret as Ricky (seasons 5–6), Kane's second-in-command.
Tamara Taylor as Cassandra Turner (season 6), Veronique's estranged mother and a con-artist who works with her daughter to recover Franklin's stolen money.

Guest

Taylor Kowald as Kristen Grelli (season 1), Victoria's sister who is killed by Alejandro to cover loose ends.
Jonathan Avigdori as Yuda (seasons 1–3), one of Avi's two bodyguards.
Adam Karst as Muir (seasons 1–3, 5), another of Avi's two bodyguards.
Mark Harelik as Arnold Tulfowitz (seasons 1, 3), Cissy's former employer and a corrupt real estate tycoon.
Shaun McKinney as Karvel (seasons 1, 3), a sadist, ruthless gangster and member of The HTB Western Tribe.
Zabryna Guevara as Elena Usteves (seasons 1–2), Alejandro's wife and the leader of a Contra cell in Nicaragua.
Frank Merino as Guillermo "Memo" Mendoza (seasons 1–2), an enforcer for Los Monarcas.
Stephanie Nash as Gladys Warren (seasons 1–2), Teddy's assistant at the CIA.
Adriana Barraza as Mariela Villanueva (seasons 1, 3), Lucia's mother and the matriarch of the Villanueva Cartel.
Manuel Uriza as Miguel Villanueva (seasons 2–3), Lucia's paternal uncle who is a private investigator.
Alanna Ubach as Gabriella Elias (season 2), the leader of La Fuerza, a high-ranking gang in the Mexican Mafia.
Herve Clermont as Stern (seasons 2–6), a Detective in the LAPD Homicide Division.
Hector Hugo as Muñoz Avilés (seasons 2–3), Stern's partner and a Detective in the LAPD Homicide Division.
John Diehl as Colonel Robert McDonald (seasons 3–4, 6), Teddy and Matt's estranged father.
Sabina Zúñiga Varela as Nuvia Zapata (seasons 3–4), Hernan's step wife.
Damien D. Smith as Top Notch (seasons 3–4, 6), an old friend of Alton's who he pays to investigate Teddy.
Ariel Eliaz as Lior (seasons 3–4, 6), an enforcer for Avi's Crew.
Antonio Jaramillo as Oscar Fuentes (season 4), the corrupt police chief of the Tijuana Police Department.
Jeremiah Birkett as John Baxter (season 4), a homeless crack cocaine addict and single father at Alton's homeless shelter.
Brent Jennings as Henry Nelson (season 4), Irene's ex-husband and an independent journalist.
Steven Williams as Paul Davis (season 4), a real estate tycoon with political ties.
Troy Blendell as Charlie Cass (season 4), the acting Editor-in-chief at the Los Angeles Herald Examiner.
James Moses Black as Brother Jamal (season 4), the radio talk show host for CO-INTELPRO.
David Sullivan as Grady Williamson (season 5), a CIA agent who replaces Teddy as the CIA plug.
Santiago Veizaga as Clever (season 5), a young gangbanger in Bell Gardens.
Raymond J. Barry as Old Man James (season 5), an elderly man who collects hunting trophies and keeps a pet tiger at his house in Bell Gardens.
Jon Root as William Cox (seasons 5–6), an accountant hired by Teddy to set up untraceable bank accounts.
Darrin Cooper as Jacob (seasons 5–6), a KGB agent and Rubén's handler.
Danielle Larracuente as Amanda (season 6), a DEA agent and part of Marino's team.
Arsenio Castellanos as Oscar (season 6), a DEA agent and another member of Marino's team.
Aaron Bledsoe as Todd (season 6), a cookhouse manager for Kane's crew.
Omar Dorsey as Clyde (season 6), an old friend of Jerome's who runs an auto repair shop.

Episodes

Series overview

Season 1 (2017)

Season 2 (2018)

Season 3 (2019)

Season 4 (2021)

Season 5 (2022)

Season 6 (2023)

Broadcast
Outside of the United States, Snowfall premiered on BBC Two in the United Kingdom on October 8, 2017. It is also available for view on BBC iPlayer.

Reception

Critical response
On Rotten Tomatoes, the first season has an approval rating of 62% based on 63 reviews, with an average rating of 6.2/10. The site's critical consensus for the first season reads, "Snowfall struggles to create a compelling drama from its separate storylines, despite Singleton's accurate recreation of 1983 Los Angeles and a strong lead performance from Damson Idris." On Metacritic, the series has a score of 63 out of 100, based on 47 critics, indicating "generally favorable reviews." A 100% approval rating for the second season was reported by Rotten Tomatoes, with an average rating of 7/10 based on 7 reviews. A 100% approval rating for the third season was reported by Rotten Tomatoes with an average rating of 9/10 based on 5 reviews.

Matt Zoller Seitz of Vulture called Snowfall  a clever constructed thriller that reaches the "standard Scorsese/Tarantino," praising "the attention it pays to the sights, sounds and textures of people's lives in 1983 Los Angeles, and to fine details of characterization — in other words, the sort of stuff that would never get a dramatic series a green light unless drugs and violence were attached to it." He further stated: "rather than go for a vibe like The Wire or Steven Soderbergh's Traffic, which explored the drug trade with a newspaperman's anthropological detachment, Snowfall aims for a bouncier, more seductive vibe." Seitz also praised the "phenomenal" acting of Idris, Peris-Mencheta, Hudson, and Rios. James Poniewozik of The New York Times praised the performances of the actors, found the series emotional, and complimented its story. Brian Tallerico of RogerEbert.com found the series narratively ambitious and applauded the performances of the cast members, stating the actors represent the show's greatest asset, writing, "Idris is a fantastic find, conveying a combination of intelligence and innocence that makes Franklin’s arc feel genuine. [...] Rios is even better as a more-experienced player in the drug game who has yet to lose her hope for something bigger. Finally, McDonald vacillates in fascinating ways from a pencil pusher to someone willing to do whatever it takes to redeem his legacy as an agent."

Ed Power of The Telegraph rated the series 4 out of 5 stars, saying, "It’s slick and breezy – far too enamoured with its roguish characters to do justice to a cathartic chapter in the history of modern Los Angeles. But the show has a giddy energy and, amid the blizzard of gangster clichés, Idris shines brightly as star in the making." Melissa Camacho of Common Sense Media rated the series 3 out of 5 stars, writing, "Snowfall is a dark and gritty series about the crack cocaine trade and that it is intended for adults. [...] The characters are complex and live by ambiguous codes, but most seek personal gains by buying/selling drugs. Those old enough to handle it will find a series that's complex and intelligent, but sometimes hard to watch.

Alan Sepinwall of Uproxx gave a mixed review of the series, criticizing the show's clichéd storytelling and pacing; the latter he observed, "oddly feels sluggish and rushed at the same time, lingering over certain tasks and story beats... but then oddly jumping over story points in a way that had me frequently checking to be sure I hadn't skipped an episode by mistake." He further emphasized: "Snowfalls not a bad drama at this stage, just more generic than it should be, especially on a channel known for making old TV ideas feel brand-new."

Ratings

Season 1

Season 2

Season 3

Season 4

Season 5

Season 6

Accolades

Notes

References

External links

2017 American television series debuts
2010s American crime drama television series
2020s American crime drama television series
2010s American black television series
2020s American black television series
Bloods
Cali Cartel
Crips
English-language television shows
Fictional portrayals of the Los Angeles Police Department
FX Networks original programming
Mexican Mafia
Television productions suspended due to the COVID-19 pandemic
Television series about the Central Intelligence Agency
Television series about illegal drug trade
Television series about organized crime
Television series set in 1983
Television shows about cocaine
Television shows set in Los Angeles
Works about African-American organized crime
Works about Jewish-American organized crime
Works about Colombian drug cartels
Works about Mexican drug cartels